Knut Sørensen (3 October 1924 – 18 December 2009) was a Norwegian footballer. He played in one match for the Norway national football team in 1949.

References

External links
 

1924 births
2009 deaths
Norwegian footballers
Norway international footballers
Place of birth missing
Association footballers not categorized by position